Church of St. Panteleimon known also as Vodica in Mirkovci in eastern Croatia is a secondary Serbian Orthodox church of the local parish Church of St. Nicholas.

Contemporary church at the site of a water source was constructed in 1910. The church is used by orthodox population of Mirkovci and the rest of Syrmia for summer celebration of Saint Pantaleon. The site is known of its tilia veteran tree. The church is located outside of the village and off the main D46 road in village's field estate.

The church uses certain gothic revival architectural elements (notably windows) which are not commonly found in Eastern Orthodox sacral architecture.

Gallery

See also
Eparchy of Osječko polje and Baranja
Serbs of Croatia
Church of St. Nicholas, Mirkovci
Gothic Byzantine architectural elements at the UNESCO protected Visoki Dečani monastery
Belarusian Gothic
List of Serbian Orthodox churches in Croatia

References

Mirkovci
Vinkovci
Churches completed in 1910
20th-century Serbian Orthodox church buildings
Gothic Revival church buildings in Croatia